Virginie Ledieu (born August 2, 1960) is a French actress who specializes in dubbing. She is the daughter of Marion Game. She is the official dubbing voice of Alyson Hannigan.

Voice roles

Television animation
Chip 'n Dale Rescue Rangers (Gadget Hackwrench (Tress MacNeille))
Jem (Kimber Benton (Cathianne Blore))
Love Hina (Mutsumi Otohime (Satsuki Yukino))
Saint Seiya (Athena (Keiko Han, Fumiko Orikasa))

Video games
The Longest Journey (Emma)
Neverwinter Nights (Linu La'neral)

Live action
American Pie (Michelle Flaherty (Alyson Hannigan))
City of Angels (Maggie (Meg Ryan))
Dead Calm (Rae Ingram (Nicole Kidman))
Die Hard 2 (Samantha Coleman (Sheila McCarthy))
D.O.A. (Sydney Fuller (Meg Ryan))
Innerspace (Lydia Maxwell (Meg Ryan))
Lethal Weapon 2 (Rika van den Haas (Patsy Kensit))

External links
 

1960 births
Living people
French film actresses
French stage actresses
French television actresses
French video game actresses
French voice actresses